Amy Heather Walsh (born September 13, 1977) is a former midfielder for the Canada women's national soccer team. From 1997 to 2009, she played 102 matches for the national team. In May 2017, Walsh was inducted into the Canadian Soccer Hall of Fame. Her sister, Cindy Walsh, also played for the Canadian women's team.

Playing career
Walsh attended the University of Nebraska, where she was twice named in the first team (All-Conference) and once in the first-team (All-Central Region). She played professionally for the Atlanta Beat of Women's United Soccer Association, and also played for the Montreal Xtreme and Laval Comets of the American W-League. Walsh played her last season in 2009. She gave birth to a child in January 2010. Since then she has not returned with the Laval Comets nor Canada's national team.

Honours and awards

 Olympic Participant (Canada, 2008)
 Women's World Cup Participant (Canada, 1999, 2007)
 Canadian National Team Member (1997 to 2009)
 Canadian Soccer Hall of Fame (2017)
 College Soccer Online Third-Team All-American (1999)
 Soccer Buzz Honorable-Mention All-American (1998)
 NSCAA First-Team All-Central Region (1999)
 NSCAA Second-Team All-Central Region (1998)
 First-Team All-Big 12 Conference (1998, 1999)
 First-Team Academic All-Big 12 Conference (1999)
 Honorable-Mention Academic All-Big 12 (1999)

References

External links
 
 
 / Canada Soccer Hall of Fame
 Profile at WUSA 
 (French) Profile on Laval Comets website 
 (French) Profile on Radio-Canada sports 

1977 births
Living people
Canadian expatriate sportspeople in the United States
Canadian expatriate women's soccer players
Canadian women's soccer players
Canada women's international soccer players
Canadian people of Irish descent
Women's association football midfielders
1999 FIFA Women's World Cup players
2007 FIFA Women's World Cup players
Footballers at the 2008 Summer Olympics
Nebraska Cornhuskers women's soccer players
Olympic soccer players of Canada
Soccer players from Montreal
FIFA Century Club
Anglophone Quebec people
Pan American Games competitors for Canada
Atlanta Beat (WUSA) players
McGill Martlets soccer players
USL W-League (1995–2015) players
Pan American Games bronze medalists for Canada
Medalists at the 2007 Pan American Games
Pan American Games medalists in football
Footballers at the 2007 Pan American Games
Ottawa Fury (women) players
Laval Comets players
Expatriate women's soccer players in the United States
Women's United Soccer Association players